Jean-Baptiste Germain (in Occitan Joan Baptista Germain) was an 18th-century Occitan writer from Provence. He was also a French diplomat in Algeria at the service of the Compagnie Royale d'Afrique.

He was born in Marseille in 1701 and died in the same town in 1781.

His most famous work is La Bourrido deis Dieoux (La Borrida dei Dieus, in classical Occitan), published in 1760 and also in 1820 in the anthology Lou Bouquet Prouvençau (Lo Boquet provençau).

Literary work 
 La Borrida dei Dieus
 La Matrona d'Efeba
 La Barbariá d'un Anglés sus sa Mestressa
 Òda au Rei de Prussa
 Lo Trionfe de Marselha
 Lei Delicis dau Terrador
 Parafrasa dau Saume de Dàvid 108
 L'Apologia de la Borrida dei Dieu

External links 
 
 "Germain" by the Occitan writer Glaudi Barsotti on Leis Amics de Mesclum website
 Google book edition of Lo Boquet Provençaou
  Google book edition of the Revue Africaine that deals with Germain's African diplomatic activities

Occitan-language writers
Diplomats from Marseille
18th-century French diplomats
1701 births
1781 deaths
18th-century French writers
18th-century French male writers
Writers from Marseille